Dactyladenia dichotoma is a species of plant in the family Chrysobalanaceae. It is endemic to Nigeria. It is threatened by habitat loss.

References

dichotoma
Endemic flora of Nigeria
Critically endangered plants
Taxonomy articles created by Polbot
Plants described in 1920
Taxa named by Émile Auguste Joseph De Wildeman